Charlotte Löwensköld is a 1925 novel by the Swedish writer Selma Lagerlöf. It is the second installment in Lagerlöf's Ring trilogy, or The Ring of the Löwenskölds. Thus it follows The Löwensköld Ring and is followed by Anna Svärd. 

Charlotte Löwensköld was first translated into English by Velma Swanston Howard under the original title, and so published by Doubleday, Doran in 1927—prior to the first English-language edition of The Löwensköld Ring.

The novel has been adapted for the screen as a 1930 film, and as a 1979 film starring Ingrid Janbell, both under the original title.

See also
 1925 in literature
 Swedish literature

References

External links
 

1925 Swedish novels
Novels by Selma Lagerlöf
Albert Bonniers Förlag books
Swedish-language novels